Ion Iulian Panait (born May 5, 1981 in Mizil) is an amateur Romanian Greco-Roman wrestler, who played for the men's welterweight category. He won two silver medals for his division at the 2008 European Wrestling Championships in Tampere, Finland, and at the 2010 European Wrestling Championships in Baku, Azerbaijan. He is also a member of Dinamo București, and is coached and trained by Carare Petrica.

Panait represented Romania at the 2008 Summer Olympics in Beijing, where he competed for the men's 66 kg class. He received a bye for the second preliminary round, before losing out to China's Li Yanyan, with a technical score of 3–3 and a classification score of 1–3.

References

External links
Profile – International Wrestling Database
NBC 2008 Olympics profile

1981 births
Living people
Olympic wrestlers of Romania
Wrestlers at the 2008 Summer Olympics
Wrestlers at the 2016 Summer Olympics
People from Mizil
Romanian male sport wrestlers
21st-century Romanian people